Thomas Manning (died c. 1469) was the Archdeacon of Totnes during 1453 and Dean of Windsor from 1455 to 1461.

Career
Appointments:
Vicar of West Thurrock, Essex
Vicar of Gingrave, Essex
Vicar of West Horndon, Essex
Prebendary of Nassington in Lincoln Cathedral 1451 - 1463
Archdeacon of Totnes 1453
Treasurer of Salisbury Cathedral 1454 - 1462
Prebendary of Colwall in Hereford Cathedral 1459 - 1462
Prebendary of Holborn in St Paul's Cathedral 1459 - 1462
Dean of Windsor 1455 - 1461

He lost his appointment as Dean of Windsor in 1461 following the Lancastrian defeat at the Battle of Towton in 1461. He was at dinner with King Henry VI at Myrton, near Clitheroe when he was betrayed and captured by the Yorkists in July 1466.

References

Archdeacons of Totnes
Deans of Windsor
1469 deaths
Year of birth unknown
Year of death uncertain